Prudent was a 74-gun ship-of-the-line in service with the Royal French Navy. Built in Rochefort in 1753, she entered service during the opening year of the French and Indian War (1754–1763). During the 1758 Siege of Louisbourg she was one of a fleet of 11 ships trapped in Louisbourg by a superior Royal Navy force; during the final night of the siege, she was boarded by British sailors and set afire, resulting in her loss.

References 

1753 ships
Ships of the line of France
Maritime incidents in 1758